Gustav Glück (6 April 1871, Vienna – 18 November 1952, Santa Monica, Cal.) was an Austrian art historian, the author of several major books on Dutch art. 

Glück became an Assistant at the Vienna Kunsthistorisches Museum in 1900, Curator and de facto Director in 1911, and Director in name in 1916. He resigned the directorship of the Vienna Gallery in 1931, moved from Vienna to London in 1938, and moved to Santa Monica in 1942. As a Festschrift, his students published a two-volume annotated collection of his periodical articles in 1933.

Literary works 
 Die Kunst der Renaissance in Deutschland, in Niederlanden, Frankreich,  1933
 Bruegels Gemälde,  1934
 Die Landschaften von D. D. Rubens,  1942

References

External links
Entry at the Dictionary of Art Historians

Austrian art historians
1871 births
1952 deaths